The 60th edition of the Vuelta a Colombia was held from August 1 to August 15, 2010.

Stages

2010-08-01: La Ceja — Rionegro (20 km)

2010-08-02: Rionegro — Puerto Boyacá (164 km)

2010-08-03: Puerto Boyacá — Barrancabermeja (191 km)

2010-08-04: Barrancabermeja — Bucaramanga (117 km)

2010-08-05: Bucaramanga — San Gil-Socorro (117 km)

2010-08-06: Socorro — Tunja (165.2 km)

2010-08-07: Boyacá Tunja — Duitama (147 km)

2010-08-08: Duitama-Briceño — La Calera-Bogotá (147 km)

2010-08-09: Bogotá La Vega — Libano (229 km)

2010-08-10: Armero — La Tebaida (203 km)

2010-08-12: Yumbo — Pereira (204 km)

2010-08-13: Pereira — Manizales (117 km)

2010-08-14: Manizales — Alto de Palmas (206 km)

2010-08-15: Medellín — Medellín (34 km)

Jersey progression

Final classification

Teams 

Lotería de Boyacá

 Director Deportivo: Hernan Aleman

EPM–UNE

 Director Deportivo: Raul Mesa Orozco

Néctar de Cundinamarca-Pinturas Bler

 Director Deportivo: Raul Gomez

Indeportes Antioquia-IDEA-FLA-Lotería de Medellín

 Director Deportivo: Rafael Antonio Niño

Boyacá Orgullo de America

 Director Deportivo: Angel Yesid Camargo

GW Shimano-CHEC-Edec-Envia

 Director Deportivo: Luis Alfonso Cely

Colombia es Pasión-472-Café de Colombia

 Director Deportivo: Fernando Saldarriaga

Empresa de Energia de Boyacá EBSA

 Director Deportivo: Carlos Mario Jamallo
Super Giros

 Director Deportivo: William Palacio

Fuerzas Armadas-Ejercito Nacional

 Director Deportivo: Raúl Gómez

IMRD Cota-Flejes Bonelo

 Director Deportivo: Jose Bonelo

Formesan-Panachi-Inder Santander

 Director Deportivo: Federico Muñoz

See also 
 Clásico RCN

References 
 
 
 

Vuelta a Colombia
Colombia
Vuelta Colombia